Brandi Denise Chastain (born July 21, 1968) is an American retired soccer player, two-time FIFA Women's World Cup champion, two-time Olympic gold-medalist, coach, and sports broadcaster. She played for the United States national team from 1988 to 2004. In her 192 caps on the team, she scored 30 goals playing primarily in the defender and midfielder positions. She scored a World Cup-winning penalty shootout goal against China in the 1999 FIFA Women's World Cup final.

Chastain played professionally for Shiroki FC in the Japan Women's Football League, the San Jose CyberRays of the Women's United Soccer Association, FC Gold Pride of Women's Professional Soccer, and California Storm of Women's Premier Soccer League.

Chastain was named to the USWNT All-Time Best XI in 2013. In March 2017, she was inducted into the National Soccer Hall of Fame. In 2018 she was inducted into the Bay Area Sports Hall of Fame.

Early life
Chastain was born and raised in San Jose, California and began playing soccer at the age of eight. Because there was no girls soccer team available for her to play on at Davis Junior High School, she played for the boys' soccer team after a successful tryout.
Chastain attended Archbishop Mitty High School and helped lead the team to three consecutive Central Coast Section championships.

Playing career

Collegiate

California Golden Bears, 1986
Chastain attended University of California, Berkeley where she played as a forward for the Golden Bears and scored 15 goals as a freshman. Following her first and only year with the Bears, she was named All-American and earned Freshman Player Of The Year honors by Soccer America. Soon after, she underwent reconstructive anterior cruciate ligament (ACL) surgeries on both knees which caused her to miss the 1987 and 1988 seasons.

Santa Clara Broncos, 1989–1990 
After transferring to Santa Clara University ahead of the 1989 season, Chastain helped lead the Broncos to two consecutive Final Four NCAA College Cup appearances (for the first time ever) in 1989 and 1990. Chastain scored ten goals for the Broncos during the regular season. In 1990, she was a national scoring leader with 22 goals (50 points) and helped the Broncos to a  record. The same year, she was named the ISAA Player of the Year. She also won the Honda Sports Award as the nation's top soccer player.

International 
Of her 192 international career caps, Chastain played 89 primarily as a defender but occasionally as a midfielder. On June 1, 1988, she earned her first cap for the United States women's national soccer team during a match against Japan. She scored her first international goal on April 18, 1991. After coming in as a substitute forward, she scored five consecutive goals in the team's 12–0 win against Mexico during the 1991 CONCACAF Women's Championship.

1991 FIFA Women's World Cup 
The U.S. went on to win the inaugural 1991 FIFA Women's World Cup in China.

1995 FIFA Women's World Cup 
Chastain was not called for the 1995 FIFA Women's World Cup in Sweden, in which the U.S. won the bronze medal.

1996 Summer Olympics 
Playing as a defender, Chastain competed with the national team at the 1996 Women's Olympic Football Tournament in Atlanta, the first Olympic tournament to include women's soccer. She played every minute of the U.S.' games despite suffering a third serious knee injury during the semifinal against Norway. The Americans won the gold medal after defeating China 2–1 in the final.

1999 FIFA Women's World Cup 
In the quarter-finals of the 1999 FIFA Women's World Cup, Chastain scored an own goal in the fifth minute for Germany. However, she redeemed herself by scoring the second equalizing goal for the U.S. in the 49th minute, finishing a corner kick that was taken by Mia Hamm. The match ended with a 3–2 win to the U.S. to advance to the semi-finals against Brazil, which they won 2–0. Later on, Chastain who had missed a penalty kick in the Algarve Cup against China months earlier, scored the deciding penalty against the same opponent in the final, clinching the World Cup title for the U.S. in the Rose Bowl, Pasadena.

Club

Shiroki FC, 1993 
In 1993, Chastain played club soccer for one season in Japan's L.League for Shiroki FC. She earned team most valuable player (MVP) honors and was the only foreigner to be named one of the league's top 11 players.

San Jose CyberRays, 2001–2003 
Following the success of the 1999 FIFA Women's Cup, Chastain was a founding player in the Women's United Soccer Association, the first professional women's soccer league in the United States. She played for the San Jose CyberRays all three years of the league's existence. During the league's inaugural season, she helped the team finish second in the regular season with a  record securing a berth to the playoffs. The team eventually won the league's championship title after defeating the Atlanta Beat in penalty kicks.  Chastain started in all 19 games in which she played during the regular season, scored 2 goals, and provided 5 assists. During the playoffs, she started in both games and scored two goals.

The CyberRays finished in fifth place during the 2002 season with a  record. Chastain started in all 18 games in which she played, scored 4 goals, and provided 3 assists.
During the 2003 season, Chastain started in all 15 games as a defender, scored 1 goal, and provided 4 assists. San Jose finished in sixth place during the regular season with a  record.

FC Gold Pride, 2009 
In 2009 at age 40, Chastain played as a midfielder for FC Gold Pride in Women's Professional Soccer (WPS), the second professional women's soccer league in the United States. She was selected in the seventh round of the 2009 WPS Draft. She started in five of the ten games in which she played. The Pride finished in last place during the regular season with a  record. Chastain was released by the team in February 2010.

Coaching 
In 2014 Chastain started coaching soccer at Bellarmine College Preparatory where she assisted the head coach. In 2018 she assisted in leading Bellarmine to their first CCS open division championship title.

Career statistics

International

Clubs

In popular culture

Goal celebration
On July 10, 1999, at the 1999 FIFA Women's World Cup Final at the Rose Bowl in Pasadena, California, after scoring the fifth kick in the penalty shootout to give the United States the championship, and the win over China in the final game, Chastain celebrated by spontaneously taking off her jersey and falling to her knees in a sports bra, her fists clenched, flexing her arms. Removing a jersey in celebration of a goal is so common in men's soccer that it has, at times, been cause for an automatic yellow card caution, according to the Laws of the Game. The image of her celebration was described in The New York Times as "most iconic photograph ever taken of a female athlete", and it has been considered one of the more famous photographs of a woman celebrating an athletic victory. Chastain described the celebration as "momentary insanity, nothing more, nothing less. I wasn't thinking about anything. I thought, 'This is the greatest moment of my life on the soccer field.'"

The next year, FIFA made it a yellow card offense for men or women to celebrate by removing their jerseys.

In 2019, her celebration was commemorated with a bronze statue by Brian Hanlon outside the stadium where it occurred.

In the UEFA Women's Euro 2022 Final at Wembley, England striker Chloe Kelly celebrated her 110th-minute goal against Germany in the same way. Like Chastain, Kelly's goal was a match and tournament winner – in Kelly's case, securing not only the Lionesses' first ever major trophy but the first England senior team major trophy (men's or women's) since the men's team won the 1966 World Cup as hosts. Chastain acknowledged and congratulated Kelly, saying it put "a big smile on my face" and jokingly telling her to "enjoy the free rounds of pints and dinners for the rest of [her] life" from England fans. Chastain and Kelly later also swapped shirts after the United States' friendly against England at Wembley that October.

Television and film 
Chastain has been featured on numerous television shows including The Late Late Show with Craig Kilborn, The Tonight Show with Jay Leno, Late Show with David Letterman, and Good Morning America.
In February 2001, Chastain appeared on an episode of Celebrity Jeopardy! and won with one dollar. The children's cancer research organization that she played for received $15,000. In 2007, Chastain appeared in the HBO documentary Dare to Dream: The Story of the U.S. Women's Soccer Team. The 44-minute film, Brandi Chastain: A Tribute to a Champion was broadcast on Fox Soccer in December 2010 and focused on Chastain's testimonial game that occurred in October of the same year.

Chastain appeared as Candy in the season 6 premiere of Fresh Off the Boat, an episode which also included her World Cup winning goal in 1999.

Magazines and books 
Following the 1999 World Cup, photos of Chastain's goal celebration were featured on the covers of Sports Illustrated, Time, and Newsweek as well as numerous newspapers around the world. In 2015, the Sports Illustrated cover was voted as the second most iconic cover in the history of the magazine. The same year, she posed nude except for soccer cleats and a strategically placed soccer ball for Gear Magazine. In November 2008, she was featured in Runner's World.

In 2005, Chastain's book, It's Not About the Bra: Play Hard, Play Fair, and Put the Fun Back Into Competitive Sports was published by HarperCollins.

Endorsements
Following the 1999 FIFA Women's World Cup, Chastain signed a number of endorsement deals, including Nike. 
She was the official spokesperson for Pfizer's (legacy Wyeth) multivitamin product Centrum Ultra. In July 2016, she partnered with pharmaceutical company AbbVie Inc. to promote education and awareness about inflammatory bowel disease (IBD). In 1999, she was featured on the Wheaties box. She has appeared in television commercials for Nike, Bud Light, and Gatorade.

Broadcasting career

Chastain has worked as a color commentator for soccer matches on two networks. She broadcast for NBC Sports during the 2008 and 2012 Summer Olympics. Her work with ABC/ESPN has included Major League Soccer matches and being part of a rotation of studio commentators for the 2011 FIFA Women's World Cup.

Personal life
Chastain married Santa Clara Broncos head coach Jerry Smith on June 9, 1996. Their son, Jaden Chastain Smith, was born in June 2006. She is stepmother to Smith's older son, Cameron. In March 2016, Chastain announced that she would donate her brain after death for concussion research.  On December 10, 2019, Chastain was inducted into the California Hall of Fame by governor Gavin Newsom.

See also

 List of FIFA Women's World Cup winning players
 List of Olympic medalists in football
 List of 1996 Summer Olympics medal winners
 List of 2000 Summer Olympics medal winners
 List of 2004 Summer Olympics medal winners
 List of FC Gold Pride players
 List of ESPN Major League Soccer personalities
 List of MLS Cup broadcasters
 List of athletes on Wheaties boxes
 USWNT All-Time Best XI

References

Further reading
 Carlson Berne, Emma (2016), What a Kick: How a Clutch World Cup Win Propelled Women's Soccer, Capstone Classroom, 
 Chastain, Brandi (2005), It's Not About the Bra: Play Hard, Play Fair, and Put the Fun Back Into Competitive Sports, HarperCollins, 
 Grainey, Timothy (2012), Beyond Bend It Like Beckham: The Global Phenomenon of Women's Soccer, University of Nebraska Press, 
 Kassouf, Jeff (2011), Girls Play to Win Soccer, Norwood House Press, 
 Lisi, Clemente A. (2010), The U.S. Women's Soccer Team: An American Success Story, Scarecrow Press, 
 Longman, Jere (2009), The Girls of Summer: The U.S. Women's Soccer Team and How it Changed the World, HarperCollins, 
 Medlock Adams, Michelle (2005), Brandi Chastain: Not Just One of the Boys, Mitchell Lane Publishers,

External links

 
 FC Gold Pride player profile (archived)
 San Jose CyberRays player profile (archived)
 
 
 
 The goal against China

1968 births
Living people
Association football commentators
California Golden Bears women's soccer players
Footballers at the 1996 Summer Olympics
Footballers at the 2000 Summer Olympics
Footballers at the 2004 Summer Olympics
Olympic gold medalists for the United States in soccer
Olympic silver medalists for the United States in soccer
Soccer players from San Jose, California
United States women's international soccer players
Santa Clara Broncos women's soccer players
Women's United Soccer Association players
San Jose CyberRays players
FC Gold Pride players
American women's soccer players
FIFA Century Club
1999 FIFA Women's World Cup players
2003 FIFA Women's World Cup players
1991 FIFA Women's World Cup players
Participants in American reality television series
Medalists at the 2004 Summer Olympics
FIFA Women's World Cup-winning players
Shiroki FC Serena players
Nadeshiko League players
American expatriate women's soccer players
Expatriate women's footballers in Japan
American expatriate sportspeople in Japan
Women's association football utility players
Women's association football midfielders
Women's association football defenders
Major League Soccer broadcasters
Medalists at the 2000 Summer Olympics
Medalists at the 1996 Summer Olympics
Women association football commentators
National Soccer Hall of Fame members
California Storm players
Women's Premier Soccer League players
Women's Professional Soccer players